Jim McCormick is a Grammy- and CMA-nominated, multiplatinum-selling songwriter. He is currently a staff writer at Eclipse Music Publishing.

In 2021 his song "The Good Ones" was nominated by the Country Music Association for Song of the Year.  That same year "The Good Ones" won the Favorite Country Song category at the American Music Awards.

McCormick has celebrated three #1 songs on the Billboard Country Airplay chart: Gabby Barrett's "The Good Ones" and Jason Aldean's "Take A Little Ride," both of which spent three weeks in the #1 position; and Brantley Gilbert's "You Don't Know Her Like I Do." Current releases written by McCormick include Trace Adkins' "Welcome To," Luke Bryan's "All My Dreaming There," Jason Aldean's "Lights Go Out," Harry Connick Jr.'s "I Do Like We Do," Jon Pardi's "Lucky Tonight," and Trace Adkins's "Jesus and Jones." His songs also have been recorded and performed by Tim McGraw, Keith Urban, Kelly Clarkson, Jeff Tweedy, Trisha Yearwood, Randy Travis, Ronnie Milsap, Jamey Johnson, Samantha Fish, Smash Mouth as well as many others.

Early life and education 
McCormick was born and raised in New Orleans, Louisiana. He attended Jesuit High School where he formed a band with his classmate Ed Conway. Initially a communications major his freshman year at Loyola University, he transferred into the School of Business at Georgetown University his sophomore year. While at Georgetown, McCormick enrolled in a poetry workshop led by the poet Roland Flint and became enamored with the art form, eventually switching his major to English and earning a Lannan fellowship and the Academy of American Poets "Poetry Prize." After graduating from Georgetown in 1990 with a Bachelor of Arts degree in English, McCormick moved back to New Orleans where he received a Masters of Fine Arts in poetry while teaching freshman composition at the University of New Orleans.

Musical career 
While in high school, McCormick had formed the band Resonance with classmate Ed Conway. In 1991 the two formed The Bingemen: Marc Funti (drums), Cleaver Schmidt (bass and vocals), Conway (guitar), and McCormick (vocals). Playing primarily in a roots rock style, the band toured extensively with bands such as the Continental Drifters, Better than Ezra, the subdudes, Pat McLaughlin, Dash Riprock, and Cowboy Mouth. The band released their debut EP "Motor in the Ocean" in 1991 and a full-length self-titled album in 1996. In the same year the band performed at South by Southwest and at the New Orleans Jazz and Heritage Festival. They broke up in 1999.

As a solo artist, McCormick has released four albums: 2001's Jim McCormick, You Can't Drown Your Sorrows in 2004, Live at Jazz Fest in 2012, and The Middle of the River in 2013.

McCormick has served as a board of governors' vice-president for the Recording Academy and on the board of the Nashville Songwriters Association International. For more than a decade, McCormick has been an adjunct faculty member in the Music Industry Studies program at Loyola University in New Orleans as well as lectured on the craft and business of songwriting at Berkelee College of Music, Georgetown University, Vanderbilt University, Belmont University, and Tulane University, as well as at GrammyPro and NSAI events. He is a member of Nashville's Leadership Music class of 2013 and a recipient of the Academy of American Poets "Poetry Prize" and the Cutting Edge Music Conference's Lifetime Achievement Award.

Along with notable New Orleanians PJ Morton, Jay Weigel, Raj Smoove, and others, he formed the New Orleans Music Economy (NOME) initiative in 2018 in partnership with Greater New Orleans Inc. to help promote music copyright infrastructure in his hometown.

Songwriting 
After a visit to Nashville in 2000, McCormick began to consider using his formal training in poetry to write songs. He spent the next four years splitting time between New Orleans and Nashville, where he'd sleep on friends’ couches while writing three to four songs a day. In 2003, McCormick signed his first publishing agreement with James Stroud and Jimmy Metts at Generator Music Publishing Company, where he wrote for two years before signing with Warner Chappell Music. From 2010 to 2020 he held a publishing deal with BMG. In April 2020, he signed with Eclipse Music Group.

McCormick currently splits his time between Nashville and New Orleans.

References

External links
Official Website
Official Twitter

Year of birth missing (living people)
Living people